Janpath is a Delhi Metro station on the Violet Line under the metro's phase III expansion. It is part of a plan to introduce a parallel line to the busy Yellow Line corridor as well as provide quicker access to the Blue Line by connecting Mandi House and Central Secretariat. The station was opened on 26 June 2014.

Completion

In April 2013, Delhi Metro rounded off the 1,516-metre tunnel on Mandi House-Janpath stretch of Phase-III expansion project. It took 182 days of excavation work to complete the tunnel. The 5.8 dia tunnel runs under some notable places like the American Centre, Nepal Embassy, Fulbright House, Antriksh Bhawan, Scindia House and Janpath Market to name a few.

The new metro station is targeted at easing the congestion at the Rajiv Chowk Metro station, which is bustling with more than 300,000 commuters every day. This phase three project will add an extra 140 km to Delhi's metro network, covering almost 75 percent of Delhi metropolis.

Station layout

Facilities

Connections

See also
List of Delhi Metro stations
Transport in Delhi
Delhi Metro Rail Corporation
Delhi Suburban Railway

References

External links

 Delhi Metro Rail Corporation Ltd. (Official site) 
 Delhi Metro Annual Reports
 
 UrbanRail.Net – descriptions of all metro systems in the world, each with a schematic map showing all stations.

Delhi Metro stations
Railway stations in India opened in 2014
2014 establishments in Delhi
Railway stations in New Delhi district